"Shakin' Hands" is a promotional single by Nickelback off their sixth studio album, Dark Horse, released on November 16, 2009, as the second U.S. rock radio-only single (seventh single overall).

Chart performance
The song charted at No. 49 on the Canadian Hot 100 before eventually being released as a single. It later re-entered at No. 92. The song charted at No. 11 on the Billboard Mainstream Rock chart and No. 24 on the Billboard Rock Songs chart.

Tracklist
"Shakin' Hands" (Album Version)
"Shakin' Hands" (Radio Edit)

Charts

References

Nickelback songs
2009 songs
Songs written by Robert John "Mutt" Lange
Song recordings produced by Robert John "Mutt" Lange
Songs written by Chad Kroeger
Songs written by Joey Moi